The Thomson Road–Air Line Railroad Bridge, also known as just the Thomson Road Bridge, is a bridge located on Thomson Road over the abandoned Michigan Air Line Railroad right-of-way in Howard Township, Michigan.  It was listed on the National Register of Historic Places in 1999.  It is one of the oldest examples of a concrete T-beam bridge in Michigan, and has a rare brick deck.

History
Just after the Civil War, a new rail line known as the Michigan Air Line Railroad was constructed, linking Jackson with the Michigan Central line at Niles; two years later, the route was controlled by the Michigan Central. In 1919, a cutoff was constructed through Howard Township, linking the main Michigan Central line to the Airline. This bridge was constructed at the same time, probably from a design developed by the railroad company.

The railroad beneath the bridge has been abandoned for many years and is overgrown.

Description
The Thomson Road–Air Line Railroad Bridge is one of the oldest examples of a concrete T-beam bridge in Michigan, and the only historically significant bridge of the type having multiple spans. The length of the structure is due to the wide right-of-way beneath, which was used as a railroad switchyard known as the "Hump." The bridge has an unusual brick deck, which has a slight arch. The original bridge railings are metal pipe panels strung between concrete posts. The bridge has maintained an excellent integrity.

References

External links
Images from HistoricBridges.org

Road bridges on the National Register of Historic Places in Michigan
Bridges completed in 1919
National Register of Historic Places in Cass County, Michigan
Concrete bridges in the United States
Buildings and structures in Cass County, Michigan